Enterprise State Community College is a public community college in Enterprise, Alabama. It was created by the Alabama State Board of Education in February 2003 by reorganizing Enterprise State Junior College to include the Alabama Aviation Centers at Ozark and Mobile.  In December 2009, the Alabama State Board of Education approved a name change for the college to Enterprise State Community College with a marketing name for the aviation programs as the Alabama Aviation College, a unit of Enterprise State Community College.

Notable alumni
 Bobby Bright, United States Congressman from Alabama
 Jerome Walton , 1989 Major League Baseball National League rookie of the year.

References

External links
Official website

 
Community colleges in Alabama
Educational institutions established in 1965
Universities and colleges accredited by the Southern Association of Colleges and Schools
Education in Coffee County, Alabama
Education in Dale County, Alabama
Education in Mobile, Alabama
Education in Marshall County, Alabama
Education in Covington County, Alabama
1965 establishments in Alabama
NJCAA athletics